Charles Horne may refer to:

Charles Horn (writer), Canadian comedy writer and producer
Charles Horn (water polo), Swiss Olympic water polo player
Charles C. Horn, American behavioral neuroscientist
Charles Edward Horn (1786–1849), English composer and singer
Charles Frederick Horn (1762–1830), English musician and composer
Charles L. Horn, founder of Federal Cartridge Corporation
Chuck Horn, Ohio state senator

See also
Charles Horne (disambiguation)
Charles Horner (disambiguation)